Imam Muhammad ibn Abd al-Wahhab Mosque (also called the Qatar State Mosque) is the national mosque of Qatar. It is named after Muhammad ibn Abd al-Wahhab, a Sunni Muslim preacher, scholar, and theologian from the Najd region in central Arabia.

The mosque was opened in 2011, with the Emir of Qatar presiding over the occasion.

Architecture
The mosque is built in traditional Arab style with modern features.

The mosque covers a total area of 175,164 sq.m. As many as 11,000 men can offer prayers in the air-conditioned central hall of the mosque and the adjacent special enclosure is spacious enough for 1200 women. There are three main doors, and 17 side entrances to the mosque. As many as 28 large domes cover the central hall while 65 domes cover the outer quadrangle. On the whole the mosque can hold a congregation of 30,000 people.

Controversy
In 2012, the mosque banned children from entering the mosque during tarawih prayers in the month of Ramadhan. This resulted in parents arguing with security staff.

A female worshiper accompanying a toddler complained that they were turned away from sunset prayers (when the mosque was fairly empty). When she protested, she was offered a prayer rug and shown to a corner near the ablution room, but was still not allowed to go upstairs to pray. Male worshipers had similar complaints.

In 2013 the ban was reinstated, causing further outrage among mosque attendees.

Mohamad al-Arefe said that Syria jihad is incumbent and did apologia for the militant Islamist group al-Nusra Front, visiting the Imam Muhammad ibn Abd al-Wahhab Mosque.

Zaghloul El-Naggar engaged in 9/11 denial and spoke twice in the Imam Muhammad ibn Abd al-Wahhab Mosque.

In a Sermon at Imam Muhammad ibn Abd al-Wahhab Mosque Sa'ad Ateeq al-Ateeq delivered a sermon, calling for the end of Jews and Christians by the hands of God and called for Muslims and Islam to be exalted by God in February 2013. On 2 October 2013 at the Imam Muhammad ibn Abd al-Wahhab Mosque, Sa'ad Ateeq al-Ateeq again called for their destruction of Christians and Jews and called for Muslims and Islam to be exalted. In February 2014 the Ministry of Awqaf and Islamic Affairs (Qatar) tweeted that the Imam Muhammad ibn Abd al-Wahhab Mosque was hosting another sermon by al-Ateeq. On 6 July 2014 during Ramadan, al-Ateeq preached at the Imam Muhammad ibn Abd al-Wahhab Mosque. on 9 July 2014 al-Ateeq also gave another Ramadan sermon at the Imam Muhammad ibn Abd al-Wahhab Mosque. Sa'ad Ateeq al-Ateeq has called for the destruction of Shias, Christians, Nusayris (Alawites), and Jews and called  for Muslims and Islam to be exalted in the Imam Muhammad ibn Abd al-Wahhab Mosque in January 2015. This was advertised on the website of the Ministry of Awqaf and Islamic Affairs (Qatar) and on the official Twitter account of the Ministry of Awqaf and Islamic Affairs (Qatar) His January 2015 sermon in the Imam Muhammad ibn Abd al-Wahhab Mosque was advertised by al-Ateeq on his Twitter. The Foundation for Defense of Democracies, The Daily Beast, and Foreign Policy magazine have run articles on Al-Ateeq and his views, with Foreign Policy having compiled a large documentation of his government sponsored activities at this Mosque.

In 2017, there has been a request published on the Saudi Arabian newspaper Okaz signed by 200 descendants of Ibn Abd al-Wahhab to change the name of the mosque, because according to their statement "it does not carry its true Salafi path", even though most Qataris adhere to Wahhabism.

References

2011 establishments in Qatar
Mosques in Doha
Mosques completed in 2011
21st-century mosques